Petra Martić (born 19 January 1991) is a Croatian professional tennis player. She has a career-high singles ranking of world No. 14, achieved in January 2020. Martić has won two singles titles on the WTA Tour, one singles and one doubles tournament on WTA Challenger Tour, plus four singles and five doubles titles on the ITF Circuit.

Early and personal life
Petra Martić was born in Split, Yugoslavia to Nenad (father) and Sandra (mother). She grew up in the village of Duće, 30 km from Split, and moved to Split at the age of 10. Her father died in a car accident when Petra was five. Petra is quoted saying that her mother is a hero to her for managing to go through all this and raising Petra by herself, and that this motivates her to excel in tennis and bring joy to her family.

Tennis career

2006–2009: Early career

The best result in her junior career was the quarterfinals in 2006 US Open. In 2007, she played her first WTA Tour main draw match as a wildcard at Miami Open, losing in first round to Russian Alina Jidkova. In 2008, Martić won the ITF Circuit Zagreb Open, defeating Yvonne Meusburger, and then made it to the quarterfinals of the WTA event Slovenia Open, losing to Julia Görges.

She qualified for the 2009 French Open and lost in the second round to 21-year-old Canadian world No. 24 Aleksandra Wozniak. She then made it to another Portorož Open quarterfinal, losing to defending champion and fifth seed Sara Errani. In September 2009, at the age of 18 years and 8 months, Martić entered top 100 for the first time (year-end ranking was No. 82).

2010: First top-20 victory
Martić began the season by falling in the qualifying stages of the Auckland Open (lost to Chanelle Scheepers) and the Sydney International (lost to Kimiko Date-Krumm). She lost in the first round of the Australian Open, falling to Sabine Lisicki.

In February, she beat third seed and world No. 15, Yanina Wickmayer, in the first round of the Open GdF Suez in Paris, winning 6–4, 3–6, 7–5. Martić broke twice and dropped serve once. She lost in the next round to Ágnes Szávay.
Martić qualified for the Indian Wells Open, where she lost in the second round to Jelena Janković.
She also scored another big win at the Miami Open as she defeated world No. 21, Aravane Rezaï, in the second round in three sets. She then lost to Yanina Wickmayer.

She lost in the first round of her next three tournaments, Andalucia Tennis Experience (lost to Estrella Cabeza Candela), Morocco Open (to Alizé Cornet ) and Portugal Open (to Kimiko Date-Krumm).

She was forced to retire in her first-round match of the Madrid Open whilst 4–6, 2–1 down. Her next tournament was the Warsaw Open where she lost in three sets to Gréta Arn, in the first round.

Martić was drawn against world No. 5, Elena Dementieva, in the first round of the French Open in which she was beaten 6–1, 6–1.
She next participated in the ITF tournament in Marseilles where she reached the quarterfinals, losing to Johanna Larsson in three sets.

Martić only played one grass tournament in the 2010 season, Wimbledon. There, she beat British No. 1, Elena Baltacha in the first round. She was due to play against Marion Bartoli in the second round; however, she was forced to retire before the match.

At the hardcourt tournaments, she lost in the first round of Slovenia Open to Katarina Srebotnik and in the first round of İstanbul Cup to Vera Dushevina.
Martić was drawn against the top seed Caroline Wozniacki in the first edition of the Danish Open where she lost.

2011: First top-50 finish
Martić qualified for the Australian Open, where she lost to Agnieszka Radwańska in the second round. Martić also made it to the semifinals of Bogota (lost to Dominguez Lino) and Copenhagen (lost to Hradecká) and beat Vesnina and Vickmayer to reach the third round of Cincinnati. She finished the year ranked inside the top 50 (at No. 49) for the first time in her career.

2012: First WTA final
Martić started the 2012 season losing in the first rounds of several tournaments including the Australian Open, Doha, and Dubai.

She reached her first WTA final at the Malaysian Open where she upset the No. 3 seed Peng Shuai in the quarterfinals and the second-seeded and former world No. 1, Jelena Janković, in the semifinals. However, she had to retire in the final against Hsieh Su-wei at 4–1 down in the third set due to fatigue and severe cramping, which she was suffering due to having defeated Janković just that morning in a marathon match that lasted over three hours.

After falling in the first rounds of Indian Wells and Miami, Martić made the semifinals of the Danish Open losing to Caroline Wozniacki, and the quarterfinals of the Budapest Grand Prix losing to Elena Vesnina.

Martić achieved a major breakthrough at the French Open. After defeating Michaëlla Krajicek in the first round, she recorded the biggest win of her career in the second round, upsetting world No. 8 and 2007 Wimbledon finalist (as well as home favorite and 2011 French Open semifinalist), Marion Bartoli, in three sets. This marked Martić's first ever win against a top 10 player, and the first time she advanced beyond the second round at any Grand Slam tournament. She followed it up with a third round win over the 29th seed Anabel Medina Garrigues before losing in the fourth round to world No. 10, Angelique Kerber. Nevertheless, her performance in Paris helped lift her to a new career-high ranking of 42.

At both Wimbledon and the US Open, Martić struggled with being drawn against unfavorable first round opponents. She drew grass court phenom Sabine Lisicki in the first round of Wimbledon, losing 6–4, 6–2, while at the US Open she was pitted against defending champion and world No. 7, Samantha Stosur, and was defeated 6–1, 6–1. She would, however, bounce back at the Pan Pacific Open, upsetting world No. 5, Petra Kvitová, in the second round. It was the first meeting between the two and the second top-ten victory of the year for Martić.

2013–2016: Struggling with injuries

The next four years of her career were plagued by injuries and poor form. In 2013, Martić made it to the third round of a WTA tournament only twice, at Katowice and Wimbledon. She also won the 2013 Nottingham Trophy (def. Karolina Plíšková in the final), but dropped out of the top 100 by the end of the year. In 2014, she scored only one WTA Tour main-draw victory, against Sorana Cîrstea in Guangzhou in September. In 2015, Martić mostly played at ITF and WTA 125 tournaments, with moderate success. The only notable result was qualifying for the Australian Open (lost to Sharapova). She finished 2015 season in October, not scoring a single victory at a WTA event main draw and only two top-100 victories during the year. She was ranked No. 148 at the end of the year.

In February 2016, she made it to the semifinals of a WTA event for the first time in four years at Rio de Janeiro in February (def. top seed Teliana Pereira, lost to Francesca Schiavone), and did not play from February to May. The last match she played was at Wimbledon in June, where she lost to Ursula Radwańska in the first round of qualifying. In September, she dropped out of the top 200.

2017–2018: Comeback
Suffering from a major back injury (disc protrusion in her lower back), Martić was not sure if she would play competitive tennis again.

After a ten-month injury lay-off, she made a come-back at $25k event at Santa Margherita di Pula. Ranked No. 659, Martić had to go through qualifying, and in the end, won the tournament (def. von Deichmann in the final). She then went on a 17–3 run leading up to 2017 French Open, reaching the final of three more ITF tournaments. Martić then qualified to her first Grand Slam main draw in two years (despite being down a match point in the final round of qualifying against Maryna Zanevska). She recorded her first Grand Slam main-draw win since Wimbledon 2013 by defeating Kateryna Bondarenko in straight sets. She then upset 12th seeded Madison Keys in the second round (her first victory over any player inside the top 20 since September 2012) in a three-set comeback win, then defeated the 17th seed Anastasija Sevastova, before losing to Elina Svitolina in the fourth round, after squandering a 5–2 lead in the third set. However, her resurgence at the French Open brought her back inside the top 150, cutting her ranking by more than half from 290th to 129th. Seeded 16th (and given another protected ranking) for the qualifying rounds at Wimbledon, Martić qualified for her second consecutive major main draw, defeating the top seed Aleksandra Krunić in her final match. She continued her resurgence by upsetting the 20th seed and newly crowned Australian No. 1, Daria Gavrilova, in the first round, winning 10–8 in the third set. She then recorded straight-set wins over Denisa Allertová and Zarina Diyas to advance to her second consecutive major fourth-round appearance (third overall and first outside the French Open), where she was defeated by Magdaléna Rybáriková. This brought her back inside the top 100 for the first time since April 2014. After Wimbledon, Martić played only four more tournaments, going 2–4, but finished the year inside the top 100 (at No. 89) for the first time since 2012.

Continuing her success from 2017, Martić made it to the fourth round of the 2018 Australian Open (her third consecutive major fourth round, and first ever on hardcourts), losing to Elise Mertens in straight sets, and reached her first quarterfinal at a Premier Mandatory event in Indian Wells (defeating world No. 6 and reigning French Open champion, Jelena Ostapenko, en route) before losing to Simona Halep in three sets. She made it to the final of the Bucharest Open, her first WTA final in six years, but lost to Sevastova. Despite losing in the second round of the French Open, and the first round of Wimbledon and the US Open, Martić won the biggest title of her career in September by defeating Mona Barthel at the Chicago Challenger, her first WTA 125 title. She finished the year ranked No. 32 in the world, her best year-end ranking to date and the second top-50 finish of her career.

2019: Best season: first WTA title, first major QF & top 15 year-end ranking
Martić had a slow start to the year. Outside of a solid showing at the Australian Open (where she was seeded 31st, her first time being seeded at a Grand Slam event, and advanced to the third round before falling to world No. 5, Sloane Stephens), Martić lost four of five matches in the first three months of the year. She regrouped at reached the semifinals of the Charleston Open in April, defeating former top-10 player Belinda Bencic along the way. At her next event, the İstanbul Cup, she reached her third career final, coming back from a set down in her first two matches as well as defeating former top-10 player Kristina Mladenovic in the quarterfinals. She then recorded another come-from-behind victory, defeating Markéta Vondroušová in the final to win her first career WTA singles title. Martić then made it to the quarterfinals of the Madrid Open, defeating two-time Grand Slam champion and former world No. 1, Garbiñe Muguruza, and compatriot Donna Vekić along the way before losing to Sloane Stephens. In April, she was nominated for the WTA Player of the Month. On 13 May, she entered the top 30 for the first time in her career – seven years, seven months and 18 days after first entering the top 50.

Seeded 31st at the French Open, Martić defeated Ons Jabeur and Mladenovic to reach the third round where she upset the second seed and world No. 2, Karolína Plíšková, in straight sets. This marked her first ever win over a top three-ranked player. She then defeated six-time Grand Slam quarterfinalist Kaia Kanepi in the fourth round to reach her first ever Grand Slam quarterfinal, becoming the first Croatian female tennis player to do so since Iva Majoli in 1998. There, she was defeated by Vondroušová in a rematch of the Istanbul final. This result lifted her into the top 25 for the first time.

Following the French Open, Martić then reached her first-ever grass-court semifinal at the Birmingham Classic, saving five match points against Ostapenko in her quarterfinal match, before losing to Julia Görges. Seeded 24th at Wimbledon, she equaled her best result at this tournament by reaching the fourth round for the second time (recording three set wins over Jennifer Brady, Anastasia Potapova, and Australian Open semifinalist Danielle Collins) where she lost to Svitolina. Following Wimbledon, she broke into the top 20 for the first time.

Martić didn't find much success during the beginning of the summer hardcourt season, losing her opening-round matches in Toronto and Cincinnati, but rebounded at the US Open, where she was seeded 22nd. After beating Tamara Zidanšek and Ana Bogdan to advance to the third round for the first time, she then upset the world No. 11, Anastasija Sevastova (who was carrying a streak of three straight US Open quarterfinal appearances), to reach the second week of a major for the third consecutive time. She lost to Serena Williams in the fourth round in straight sets. Martić carried her momentum to the start of the Asian hardcourt swing. In Zhengzhou, she reached her first Premier-level final, after beating Aryna Sabalenka in the quarterfinals and Mladenovic in the semifinals to face Plíšková for the first time since upsetting her at the French Open. However, she was unable to repeat that result, as she was defeated by the world No. 2, in straight sets. She also reached quarterfinals at the Premier-5 level Wuhan Open losing to world No. 1, Ashleigh Barty. Following this, she climbed to a new career-high ranking of No. 17 in the world. Martić's strong performances all season helped qualify her to the WTA Elite Trophy for the first time in her career. Seeded fifth and drawn into the Orchid Group, she beat wildcard Zheng Saisai, but lost to Madison Keys in straight sets. Despite all three group members finishing with an identical win–loss record and identical set win–loss record, Zheng advanced to the semifinals on a second tiebreaker, ending Martić's season. Nonetheless, she finished the year with a career-high ranking of world No. 15.

2020: Two WTA Tour semifinals, US Open 4th round
Martić had another slow start to the year losing in the second round of the Auckland Open and the Australian Open (which ended her streak of reaching the second week of majors), as well as being upset in the opening round of Hua Hin. Still, on the 13th of January she reached her singles career high ranking of No. 14 in the world. Then she made an impressive run into the semifinals of Dubai Championships without dropping a set before falling to Elena Rybakina in two tie-break sets. However, she was upset by Barbora Strýcová in the first round of the Qatar Open.

After the resumption of the WTA Tour in August, Martić reached her second semifinal of the year at the Palermo Ladies Open, before falling to Anett Kontaveit in straight sets. She then participated in the Prague Open where she beat Varvara Gracheva in straight sets, before being upset in straight sets by Kristýna Plíšková. Seeded 8th at the 2020 US Open, she lost in the fourth round to Yulia Putintseva. She finished the year ranked No 18. in the world, her second year-end top 20 finish.

2021: WTA 1000 SF, French & Australian Open QF in doubles
2021 season was a year marred with injuries and inconsistencies for Martić. She lost to world 183, qualifier Olga Danilovic, in the first round of the Australian Open. Martić did not make it past the first round in nine other tournaments, including Dubai, Madrid, Roland Garros, Montreal and Cincinnati. However, she managed to reach her first semifinal of a WTA 1000 tournament in her career at the Italian Open defeating Jessica Pegula. By the end of the year, Martić dropped out of the top 50 for the first time since April 2019.

In doubles, she reached the quarterfinals of the French Open, partnering Shelby Rogers. The pair reached also, as alternates, the quarterfinals at the Madrid Open.

2022: Return to top 50, second WTA singles title
Partnering Shelby Rogers at the Australian Open, the duo was beaten again in the quarterfinals. After two consecutive first-round losses, Martić scored her first WTA Tour victory of the season against world No. 104, Kamilla Rakhimova, at the St. Petersburg Ladies' Trophy in February. She bounced back at the Indian Wells Open, where she scored four consecutive victories (three against top-30 players) to reach the quarterfinals, where she lost to Simona Halep. At the Italian Open, she beat world No. 5, Anett Kontaveit, in the second round for her first top-5 victory since 2019 French Open. She also reached her third Wimbledon fourth round, beating world No. 9, Jessica Pegula, and losing to the eventual champion, Elena Rybakina, 5–7, 3–6. In July, she won her second career WTA Tour singles title at the Ladies Open Lausanne, beating world No. 13, Belinda Bencic, in the quarterfinal, Caroline Garcia in the semifinal and qualifierOlga Danilovic in the final. At the US Open, Martić reached the third round by defeating fourth seed Paula Badosa, in three sets, before losing to Victoria Azarenka. At the Pan Pacific Open in September, she beat sixth seed Karolina Plíšková, before losing to world No. 28, Zhang Shuai, in the quarterfinals.

Playing style

Martić employs an aggressive all-court game that exemplifies her variety. Her groundstrokes are powerful, and is able to hit both her forehand and her backhand flat, and with topspin. She is also proficient at hitting her backhand with slice, and can incorporate the drop shot effectively into points. As a result, she continually disrupts baseline rallies, creating opportunities to hit winners, or forcing opponents to commit errors. Her serve is powerful, being recorded as high as 120 mph (194 km/h), and is also reliable, allowing her to hit many aces throughout a match, whilst minimising double faults. Her return of serve is also a major weapon, ranking consistently within the top 100 of the WTA for return games won. She is a strong volleyer, due to her doubles experience, and is as comfortable at the net as she is at the baseline. She is capable of extending rallies, acting more like a counterpuncher, to draw unforced errors out of highly aggressive players, possessing a complete defensive game. Martić possesses a remarkably unique game, containing an almost complete repertoire of shots. She is proficient at playing on, and is comfortable on all surfaces, although the vast majority of her success has come on clay courts.

Performance timelines

Only main-draw results in WTA Tour, Grand Slam tournaments, Fed Cup/Billie Jean King Cup and Olympic Games are included in win–loss records.

Singles
Current after the 2023 Dubai Open.

Doubles

WTA career finals

Singles: 6 (2 titles, 4 runner-ups)

Doubles: 4 (4 runner–ups)

WTA 125 tournament finals

Singles: 1 (title)

Doubles: 1 (title)

ITF Circuit finals

Singles: 7 (4 titles, 3 runner–ups)

Doubles: 8 (5 titles, 3 runner–ups)

WTA Tour career earnings
Current after the 2022 Toray Pan Pacific Open.

Career Grand Slam statistics

Grand Slam seedings
The tournaments won by Martić are in boldface, and advanced into finals by Martić are in italics.

Head-to-head records

Record against top 10 players
Martić's record against players who have been ranked in the top 10. Active players are in boldface.

Top-10 wins
Martic has a  record against players who were, at the time the match was played, ranked in the top 10.

Notes

References

External links

 
 
 
 Petra Martić's CoreTennis Profile

1991 births
Living people
Croatian female tennis players
Tennis players from Split, Croatia